3-Methylbutyrfentanyl (3-MBF) is an opioid analgesic that is an analog of butyrfentanyl.

Side effects of fentanyl analogs are similar to those of fentanyl itself, which include itching, nausea and potentially serious respiratory depression, which can be life-threatening. Fentanyl analogs have killed hundreds of people throughout Europe and the former Soviet republics since the most recent resurgence in use began in Estonia in the early 2000s, and novel derivatives continue to appear.

See also 
 3-Methylfentanyl
 4-Fluorobutyrfentanyl
 4-Fluorofentanyl
 α-Methylfentanyl
 Acetylfentanyl
 Furanylfentanyl
 List of fentanyl analogues

References 

Synthetic opioids
Piperidines
Propionamides
Anilides
Mu-opioid receptor agonists
Designer drugs